Diego Corrientes is a 1924 Spanish silent historical film directed by José Buchs. It portrays the life of the eighteenth century highwaymen Diego Corrientes Mateos.

Cast
 María Anaya 
 Celia Escudero as María  
 José Montenegro as Tío Petaca  
 Enriqueta Palma 
 Modesto Rivas as Don Mateo Sanabria  
 José Romeu as Diego Corrientes  
 José Valle as El Renegao

References

Bibliography
 de España, Rafael. Directory of Spanish and Portuguese film-makers and films. Greenwood Press, 1994.

External links

1924 films
1920s historical films
1920s crime films
Spanish crime films
Spanish historical films
Films directed by José Buchs
Spanish silent films
Films set in the 18th century
Films set in Spain
Films set in Portugal
Spanish black-and-white films